The Grand Prix Cleveland' was a men's tennis tournament played in Cleveland, Ohio in the United States.  The event was part of the Grand Prix tennis circuit from 1972 through 1982 and in 1984 and 1985.  It was played on outdoor hard courts. It was titled the WCT Cleveland 1972 to 1973, the National Tennis Foundation Open in 1976 International Open in 1978; the Gray International in 1979; the Western Open in 1980 and 1981; the Fazio's Tennis Classic/95th Western Tennis Championships in 1982; the Society Bank Western Open Tennis Championships in 1984; and the Society Bank Tennis Classic in 1985.  It was a Challenger-level tournament in 1983.

Past finals

Singles

Doubles

External links
 ATP results archive

Defunct tennis tournaments in the United States
Cleveland
Cleveland
Cleveland
1985 disestablishments in Ohio
Sports competitions in Cleveland
Tennis in Cleveland